Max Wärn (born 10 June 1988) is a Finnish former professional ice hockey forward who played extensively in Europe.

Playing career
Wärn first played as a youth and senior level with HIFK in the Finnish SM-liiga. He was selected by the Dallas Stars in the 5th round (150th overall) of the 2006 NHL Entry Draft. After two seasons with JYP in the Liiga. Wärn left his native Finland to sign a one-year contract with Russian expansion club, HC Sochi of the KHL on 21 May 2014.

Wärn played just two games in the 2019–20 season with Swiss National League club, Lausanne HC, before he was released from his 1 month contract. On 14 February 2020, Wärn confirmed his retirement from professional hockey after 14 seasons.

References

External links

1988 births
Living people
Dallas Stars draft picks
HIFK (ice hockey) players
HPK players
HV71 players
Jokerit players
JYP Jyväskylä players
HC Kunlun Red Star players
Lahti Pelicans players
Lausanne HC players
HC Sochi players
Finnish ice hockey right wingers
Finnish expatriate ice hockey players in China
Ice hockey people from Helsinki